Minolops gertruda, common name the coral red top shell, is a species of sea snail, a marine gastropod mollusk in the family Solariellidae.

Description
The size of the shell attains 9 mm.

Distribution
This marine species is endemic to Australia and occurs off New South Wales

References

 Iredale, T. 1936. Australian molluscan notes. No. 2. Records of the Australian Museum 19(5): 267-340, pls 20-24
 Iredale, T. & McMichael, D.F. (1962). A reference list of the marine Mollusca of New South Wales. Memoirs of the Australian Museum. 11 : 1-109
 Wilson, B. (1993). Australian Marine Shells. Prosobranch Gastropods. Kallaroo, WA : Odyssey Publishing. Vol.1 1st Edn pp. 1�408

External links

Gastropods of Australia
gertruda
Gastropods described in 1936